Antero Yli-Ikkelä (born 5 March 1956) is a Finnish rower. He competed in the men's coxed pair event at the 1972 Summer Olympics.

References

1956 births
Living people
Finnish male rowers
Olympic rowers of Finland
Rowers at the 1972 Summer Olympics